Legion of Flames is the second album by Zimmers Hole. This album is noticeably more successful than their first effort, Bound by Fire, and has received many better reviews.

Track listing
"The Hole Is the Law"
"Death To The Dodgers of Soap"
"Re-Anaconda" 
"Legion of Flames"
"Well of Misfortune"
"Aerometh"
"Evil Robots"
"Gender of the Beast" (Iron Maiden parody)
"Rock Move 47"
"1000 Miles of Cock" 
"Sodomanaz" (Kim Mitchell parody)
"That's How Drunks Drink"
"Doggy Style"
"This Flight Tonight" (Joni Mitchell cover)
"White Trash Momma"
"Gaysong"
"Mushroom Mattress"
"Satan Is a Gay Porno Star"
"Platinum Shine"
"The Death of the Resurrection of the Death of Metal"

Personnel 
Chris Valagao – vocals
Jed Simon – guitar
Byron Stroud – bass
Steve Wheeler – drums

2001 albums
Zimmers Hole albums
Century Media Records albums
Albums produced by Devin Townsend